Chenarestan or Chenarastan may refer to:
Chenarestan, Khuzestan
Chenarestan-e Olya, Kohgiluyeh and Boyer-Ahmad Province
Chenarestan-e Sofla, Kohgiluyeh and Boyer-Ahmad Province
Chenarestan-e Vosta, Kohgiluyeh and Boyer-Ahmad Province
Chenarestan, Lorestan
Chenarestan, Delijan, Markazi Province
Chenarestan, Shazand, Markazi Province